UniCubeSat-GG is a Miniaturized satellite built by the Sapienza University of Rome. It was launched into Low Earth Orbit on the maiden flight of Arianespace's Vega rocket on 13 February 2012. The launch was a multi-payload mission shared with LARES, ALMASat-1, Goliat, MaSat-1, PW-Sat, ROBUSTA, e-st@r and Xatcobeo.

UniCubeSat-GG is a 1-U cubesat design with a mass of 1 kg. Its primary mission is to study the effects of orbital eccentricity through the Earth's gravity gradient.

References

External links

 GAUSS Srl - Group of Astrodynamics for the Use of Space Systems
 UniCubeSat-GG

Satellites orbiting Earth
CubeSats
Satellites of Italy
Spacecraft launched in 2012
Spacecraft launched by Vega rockets
2012 in Italy